Dhad is a gram panchayat village in Buldana Taluka in Buldhana District of Maharashtra State, India. It belongs to Vidarbha region . It belongs to Amravati Division . It is located 29 km towards west from District headquarters Buldhana. 17 km from Buldana. 424 km from State capital Mumbai.

Dhad Pin code is 443106 and postal head office is Dhad

Malkapur, Sillod, Soyagaon, Jalna are the nearby Cities to Dhad.

Ruikhed Maimba ( 5 km ), Jamthi ( 6 km ), Dhamangaon ( 7 km ), Mondhala ( 9 km ), Bhadgaon ( 9 km ) are the nearby Villages to Dhad. Dhad is surrounded by Jafrabad Taluka towards South, Buldhana Taluka towards East, Bhokardan Taluka towards west, Chikhli Taluka towards East .

Demographics 
According to Census 2011 information the location code or village code of Dhad village is 529304. Dhad village is located in Buldana tehsil of Buldana district in Maharashtra, India. It is situated 25km away from sub-district headquarter Buldana (tehsildar office) and 25km away from district headquarter Buldana. As per 2009 stats, Dhad village is also a gram panchayat.

The total geographical area of village is 1541.27 hectares. Dhad has a total population of 12,340 peoples, out of which male population is 6,485 while female population is 5,855. Literacy rate of dhad village is 72.57% out of which 77.83% males and 66.75% females are literate. There are about 2,365 houses in dhad village. Pincode of dhad village locality is 443106.

When it comes to administration, Dhad village is administrated by a sarpanch who is elected representative of the village by the local elections. As per 2019 stats, Dhad village comes under Chikhli assembly constituency & Buldhana parliamentary constituency. Buldana is nearest town to dhad for all major economic activities, which is approximately 25km away.
Villages in Buldhana district